Sporobolus caroli, also known as fairy grass or yakka grass, is a grass native to inland Australia.

References

External links

caroli
Flora of Queensland
Flora of South Australia
Plants described in 1921